Mirror, Mirror II is a co-production between Australia and New Zealand that was released in 1997. Unlike the first series, Mirror, Mirror, which was one story played out over a number of episodes, this series has individual adventures in each new episode, but there is a story linking them all.

Main cast 
 Simon James as Daniel McFarlane
 Ben Revell as Fergus McFarlane
 Antonia Prebble as Mandy McFarlane
 Jovita Shaw as Constance de Lutrelle
 Zoe Bertram as Violette de Lutrelle
 Tina Regtien as Jenny McFarlane
 Simon Ferry as Doug McFarlane
 Barry Quin as Gervaise de Lutrelle
 Melanie Thompson as Mai Ling
 Denise O'Connell as Aunt Lily

Plot

In this series, the mirror from the original Mirror, Mirror series has come into the hands of two other New Zealand families: the de Lutrelles and the McFarlanes. They both live in the same house, but are separated from each other by 130 years.

de Lutrelle family
Gervaise, Violette and their daughter Constance, live in the house in 1867, in that time the house is surrounded by goldfields. The family had emigrated from their home in France with vestiges of their wealth. They hope to find gold in the surrounding hills so they can restore their family's high status.

McFarlane family
Doug, Jenny and his two new stepchildren, live in the house in 1997. The troublesome Aunt Lily also lives with them. Doug, who left Daniel and his mother when he was a baby, agrees to have him come to visit from Sydney, Australia to connect and rekindle their relationship over the holidays, despite Doug's hesitation and Daniel's reticence at first.

Episode guide

External links
 Mirror, Mirror - Gibson Group (creators of the series)
 
Mirror, Mirror II at the National Film and Sound Archive

1997 Australian television series debuts
1998 Australian television series endings
Australian children's television series
Australian drama television series
Australian time travel television series
New Zealand time travel television series
Network 10 original programming
Period television series
Television shows funded by NZ on Air
Television series about teenagers
Television series set in the 1860s
Television series set in 1997
Television shows set in New Zealand